Nicole Reina (born 25 September 1997) is a Ukrainian-born Italian female middle-distance runner and cross-country runner, two-time national champion at senior level.

National titles
Italian Athletics Championships
3000 m steeplechase: 2013
Italian Cross Country Championships
Short race: 2021

References

External links

1997 births
Living people
Italian female middle-distance runners
Italian female steeplechase runners
Italian female cross country runners
Athletes (track and field) at the 2014 Summer Youth Olympics